Bondy is a railway station in Bondy, Seine-Saint-Denis, France. The station opened in 1849 and is on the Paris-Est–Strasbourg-Ville railway. The station is served by RER line E services operated by SNCF. Bondy is also the terminus of tramway Line 4. In the future it will see services run by Paris Metro Line 15 as well.

Train services
The station is served by the following service(s):

Local services (RER E) Haussmann–Saint-Lazare–Chelles-Gournay
Tram-train services (T4) Bondy–Aulnay-sous-Bois

Gallery

References

External links

 

Réseau Express Régional stations
Railway stations in Seine-Saint-Denis
Railway stations in France opened in 1849